Alejandro Cervantes Delgado (January 24, 1926 - September 17, 2000) was a Mexican economist and politician. Cervantes Delgado was governor of the State of Guerrero from 1981 to 1987, where he was notable for his efforts to reconcile groups with differing political opinions.

References

Governors of Guerrero
Institutional Revolutionary Party politicians
1926 births
2000 deaths
Politicians from Guerrero
People from Chilpancingo
20th-century Mexican politicians
Members of the Senate of the Republic (Mexico)
Members of the Chamber of Deputies (Mexico)
National Autonomous University of Mexico alumni